Onota angulicollis is a species of ground beetle in the family Carabidae. It is found in Central America, North America, and South America.

References

Further reading

 

Harpalinae
Articles created by Qbugbot
Beetles described in 1842